Francesco Capurro,  also known as Capuro, was a 17th-century Italian painter of the Baroque period, mainly active in Genoa and Modena. He was born in Camogli, just north of Genoa. He was one of the main pupils of the genoese Domenico Fiasella. During a trip to Rome, he was apparently influenced by the Caravaggisti painter from Naples, Jusepe Ribera. He was employed some time at the Court of Modena, and died young at Genoa, of a malignant fever.

References

17th-century Italian painters
Italian male painters
Painters from Genoa
Italian Baroque painters
Year of death unknown
Year of birth unknown